Hannah Claesson (born August 9, 1991) is a Swedish Professional soccer player from Katrineholm, Sweden. She plays for Kvarnsvedens IK in Borlänge. Sweden.

Club career

SK Slavia Praha Juniors, 2007 
In 2007, Claesson played with SK Slavia Praha juniors team. While there she scored 4 goals as a defender and played 464 minutes.

Thomas University, 2010–13 
Claesson played for Thomas University from 2010–13

For the 2010 Season, Claesson was named First Team All-Conference by the Association of Independent Institutions.

In 2011, Claesson was named to the A.I.I All-Conference First Team.

In the 2013 season, she was named to the Honorable Mention list for the Sun Conference and the Sun Conference Defensive Player of the Week (September 23–29, 2013).

On August 28, 2016, Claesson was named to Thomas University all-time top eleven for the women's team.

IFK Gävle, 2013 
From May- August 2013, Claesson played for IFK Gävle while home for summer break from Thomas University.

Västerås BK30, 2015– 2018 
Claesson joined Västerås BK30 in 2015.

Kvarnsvedens IK, 2019– Present 
Claesson signed for Kvarnsvedens IK of Elitettan in 2019.

References 

1991 births
Living people
Swedish women's footballers
Women's association football defenders
Elitettan players
Kvarnsvedens IK players
People from Katrineholm Municipality
Sportspeople from Södermanland County